Galangin is a flavonol, a type of flavonoid.

Occurrence
Galangin is found in high concentrations in plants like Alpinia officinarum (lesser galangal) and Helichrysum aureonitens. It is also found in the rhizome of Alpinia galanga and in propolis.

Biological activities
Galangin has been shown to have in vitro antibacterial and antiviral activity. It also inhibits the growth of breast tumor cells in vitro.

References

External links 
 Galangin on Chemblink.com

Flavonols
Resorcinols
Steroid sulfotransferase inhibitors